The Rallye du Maroc (Morocco Rally) was a marathon rally, similar to the Safari Rally, but that should not be confused with the  Rallye du Maroc rally raid introduced in 2000.

History
It was first run in 1934, and held intermittently until 1988. Established by the Royal Automobile Club of Morocco, it is one of the more difficult automotive rallies. In 1969 for example, 7 cars completed the course, out of a starting field of 68 vehicles.

The event was a World Rally Championship round in 1973, 1975 and 1976. The stages were varied – from shorter, but rough and challenging more typical ones to desert crossings (like in the Dakar Rally), which were very long, reaching even few hundred kilometers, making refueling during the stage mandatory.

List of winners

References

Alpha Encyclopedie/Editeur : Editions Grange Batellière / Editions Kister, Genève / Editions Erasme, Bruxelles, Anvers.
List of winners

External links
Morocco Rally at  juwra.com
French description at 

 
Recurring sporting events established in 1934
Recurring sporting events disestablished in 1988
Morocco
Motorsport competitions in Morocco
1934 establishments in Morocco
1988 disestablishments in Morocco